Sechura may be,

Sechura language
Sechuran fox